FC New Project (founded 2017) is a Latvian football club from Riga. In the 2019 season, the club's adult team participated in the Latvian First League.

Sponsors 
The club is sponsored by Adidas as their main, technical sponsor, with numerous local Latvian broadcasting networks also supporting the team.

Championship History 
2019 — Round of 16
8th place — Latvia's 1st League 2019

Roster

Players 

|-----
! colspan="9" bgcolor="#B0D3FB" align="left" |
|----- bgcolor="#DFEDFD"

|-----
! colspan="9" bgcolor="#B0D3FB" align="left" |
|----- bgcolor="#DFEDFD"

|-----
! colspan="9" bgcolor="#B0D3FB" align="left" |
|----- bgcolor="#DFEDFD"

Exclusion 
On October 30, 2019, the Disciplinary Commission of the Latvian Football Federation decided to exclude FC New Project from participation in the 1st league championship and give them a 200 euro fine, after an unlicensed player entered the field using another player's identity in an October 19 game against FK Auda. However, on 29 November 2019 after the club appealed the exclusion, the LFF Board of Appeal annulled the decision of the Disciplinary Board to exclude FC New Project  which meant that FC New Project could qualify for the 2020 League 1 championship. In the unplayed games, a technical loss of 0-3 was awarded (because the decision of the Disciplinary Committee was in force at that time). The disqualification of FC New Project head coach Alexander Osin was maintained until October 30, 2020.

External links 

 Official website

References

Football clubs in Riga